Prince Frederick or Prince Friedrich may refer to:

People
 Crown Prince Friedrich Ludwig (1698–1731), son of Duke Eberhard Ludwig of Württemberg
 Frédéric Prinz von Anhalt (born 1943), German-American socialite
 Frederick III of Denmark (1609–1670), son of Christian IV of Denmark and Anne Catherine of Brandenburg
 Frederick VIII of Denmark (1843–1912), son of Christian IX of Denmark
 Frederick IX of Denmark (1899–1972), son of Christian X and father of Margaret II of Denmark
 Frederick Henry, Prince of Orange (1584–1647), Stadtholder of Holland
 Frederick, Hereditary Prince of Anhalt-Dessau (1769–1814), son of Leopold III, Duke of Anhalt-Dessau
 Frederick, Hereditary Prince of Denmark (1753–1805), son of Frederick V of Denmark
 Frederick, Prince of Wales (1707–1751), son of George II, later Prince of Wales
 Frederik, Crown Prince of Denmark (born 1968), son of Queen Margrethe II and her husband, Prince Consort Henrik
 Prince Frederick, Duke of York and Albany (1763–1827), son of George III, later Duke of York
 Prince Frederick of Great Britain (1750–1765), son of Frederick, Prince of Wales
 Prince Friedrich of Hesse and by Rhine (1870–1873), son of Grand Duke Louis IV
 Prince Frederick of Hesse-Kassel (1720–1785), son of Landgrave William VIII
 Prince Frederick of Hesse-Kassel (1747–1837), youngest son of Prince Frederick (1720–1785)
 Prince Frederick of Hohenzollern (1891–1965), son of Prince William
 Prince Frederick of Hohenzollern-Sigmaringen (1843–1904), son of Prince Charles Anthony of Hohenzollern
 Prince Frederick of Homburg (1585–1638), son of Landgrave Frederick I of Hesse-Homburg
 Prince Frederick of Orange-Nassau (1774–1799), son of Prince William V
 Prince Frederick of Prussia (1794–1863), son of Prince Louis Charles of Prussia 
 Prince Frederick of Prussia (1911–1966), son of Crown Prince Wilhelm of Germany
 Prince Friedrich of Saxe-Meiningen (1861–1914), son of Duke Georg II
 Prince Frederick of Schaumburg-Lippe (1868–1945), son of Prince William
 Prince Frederick of Schleswig-Holstein-Sonderburg-Augustenburg (1800–1865), son of Duke Frederick Christian II
 Prince Frederik of the Netherlands (1797–1881), second son of King William I of the Netherlands
 Prince Frederick of Württemberg (1808–1870), son of Prince Paul
 Prince Frederick Adolf of Sweden (1750–1803), son of King Adolf Frederick
 Prince Frederick Augustus of Anhalt-Dessau (1799–1864), son of Frederick, Hereditary Prince of Anhalt-Dessau
 Prince Frederick Charles of Hesse (1868–1940), son of Prince Frederick William of Hesse-Kassel and briefly King of Finland
 Prince Frederick Charles of Prussia (1801–1883), son of King Frederick William III
 Prince Frederick Ferdinand Constantin of Saxe-Weimar-Eisenach (1758–1793), sone of Duke Ernest Augustus II
 Prince Friedrich Franz Xaver of Hohenzollern-Hechingen (1757–1844), an Austrian general
 Prince Friedrich Karl of Prussia (1828–1885), son of Prince Charles
 Prince Friedrich Karl of Prussia (1893–1917), son of Prince Friedrich Leopold
 Prince Friedrich Leopold of Prussia (1865–1931), son of Prince Friedrich Karl (1828–1885)
 Prince Friedrich Sigismund of Prussia (1891–1927), son of Prince Friedrich Leopold
 Prince Friedrich Wilhelm of Hohenzollern (1924–2010), son of Prince Frederick
 Prince Friedrich Wilhelm of Lippe (born 1947), son of Prince Ernst August
 Prince Friedrich Wilhelm of Prussia (1880–1925), son of Prince Albert (1837–1906)
 Prince Frederick William of Hesse-Kassel (1820–1884), son of Prince Frederick (1747–1837)
 Prince Frederick William of Schleswig-Holstein-Sonderburg-Augustenburg (1668–1714), son of Duke Ernest Günther
 Prince Frederick William of Solms-Braunfels (1770–1814), son of Prince Ferdinand

Other uses
 Prince Frederick Harbour, in York Sound, Western Australia
 Prince Frederick, Maryland, a town in the United States
 Prince Frederick Sound in southern Alaska
 HMS Prince Frederick, several ships of the Royal Navy
 Prince Frederick's Barge, the state barge of Frederick, Prince of Wales
 SS Prinz Friedrich Wilhelm, a North German Lloyd liner
 Printz Friederich, a Danish Ship-of-the-Line, which sank, with all hands, in 1780

See also: 
 Emperor Frederick (disambiguation)
 King Frederick (disambiguation)

Frederick